The Maghera transmission site is situated on a 400m hill located at Killanena in the East of County Clare, Ireland. It is home to one of 2RN's network of radio and television transmitters.

The Maghera television transmitter first went on air in February 1963 on low power before becoming fully operational on 10 September 1963. It was one of Telefís Éireann's original five main transmitters, the others being Mullaghanish, Kippure, Truskmore and Mount Leinster. The transmitter originally carried the 625 line television service on VHF Channel B (Band I), changing to Channel E (Band III) in 1999, with UHF channels being added in 1996 (TG4) and 1999 (TV3). When it was operating on Channel B certain atmospheric conditions during the summer months could cause interference from a transmitter on similar frequencies in Spain, this resulted in viewers in the south west of Ireland occasionally seeing bullfights on their television. In 1966 the new RTÉ Radio FM service started broadcasting from the site with more FM radio stations added over the years.

The original 147.5 metre mast that was erected in 1962 was replaced in 2011 with a 160 metre tall cable-stayed steel lattice mast that would enhance its service area for the start of digital terrestrial television (DTT) broadcasting. All analogue television transmissions from the site ended on 24 October 2012, and since then the Irish digital television service Saorview, has been broadcast from the site in addition to six national FM radio networks and a number of local radio services. Maghera's service area is the West of Ireland, covering counties Clare and Galway, as well as parts of counties Limerick, Kerry, Cork, Tipperary and Mayo.

Current transmissions

Digital television

FM radio

Maghera relay transmitters

References

Transmitter sites in Ireland
Buildings and structures in County Clare
1962 establishments in Ireland
Towers completed in 1962